Mr Gay World 2009, the 1st Mr Gay World pageant, was held in Whistler, Canada on February 8, 2009. Max Krzyzanowski of Ireland was crowned Mr Gay World 2009. 19 countries and territories competed for the first time for the title.

Results

Special Awards:

Contestants

 - Victor Marcelo Benitez
 - Ben Edwards
 - Michael Fröhle
 - Edson Lopes
 - Deyan Kolev
 - Darren Bruce
 - Roberto Andres Alvarez Alvarado
 - Francisco Javier Ortega
 - Max Krzyzanowski

 - Arturas Vipas Burnickis
 - Pico Velasco Michel
 - Reece Karena
 - James Ciaran Smallman
 - Kai Thomas Ryen Larsen
 - Alexis Cespedes
 - Wilbert Ting Tolentino
 - Deon Strydom
 - Antonio Pedro Almijez
 - Juan Jose Bracho

Did not attend
 - Jakub Starý
 - Dempsey Saeedian
 - Bhavin Shivji Gala
KwaZulu-Natal - Andrew Venter
 - Doug Edward Repetti

Contestants notes
Antonio Pedro Almijez (Spain) was Mr Gay Europe 2008.
Michael Fröhle (Austria), Deyan Kolev (Bulgaria), Arturas Vipas Burnickis (Lithuania), Kai Thomas Ryen Larsen (Norway) competed in Mr Gay Europe 2008.
Juan Jose Bracho (Venezuela) competed in International Mr. Gay 2008 and placed 1st Runner-up. Francisco Javier Ortega (Colombia) and Deon Strydom (South Africa) competed in International Mr. Gay 2009.

External links
Official Site

2009
2009 beauty pageants
2009 in LGBT history
2009 in Canada
February 2009 events in Canada